Major General James Henry McRae (December 24, 1863 – May 1, 1940) was a United States Army officer who served in numerous conflicts during his military career.

Early life
James Henry McRae was born December 24, 1863, to Daniel F. McRae and Marion McRae in Lumber City, Georgia. He graduated from the United States Military Academy number forty-eight of seventy-seven in the class of 1886. Several of his fellow classmates included men who would, like McRae himself, eventually rise to general officer rank, such as John J. Pershing, Charles T. Menoher, Walter Henry Gordon, Edward Mann Lewis, Mason Patrick, Julius Penn, Avery D. Andrews, John E. McMahon, Ernest Hinds, William H. Hay, George B. Duncan, Lucien Grant Berry and Jesse McI. Carter.

Military career

McRae was commissioned in the 3rd U.S. Infantry Regiment (The Old Guard) and performed frontier duty from 1886-1888. During the Spanish–American War, he was in the Battle of El Caney in Cuba, and he also served in the Sanitary Corps, for which he received his first Silver Star Commendation. He received his second Silver Star during the Philippine Insurrection and was recommended for a brevet promotion. From 1905 to 1908, he served on the General Staff, and in 1911, he graduated from the United States Army War College. McRae served in the Adjutant General's Department from 1913 to 1917, and on August 5, 1917, he was promoted to brigadier general and commanded the 158th Depot Brigade at Camp Sherman, Ohio. In addition, he commanded the 9th Brigade of the 5th Division. He was promoted to major general on April 12, 1918, and commanded the 78th Division (AEF) throughout its period of active service on the Western Front until June 1919, when it was inactivated after returning to the United States. For this, he earned the Army Distinguished Service Medal, the citation for which reads:

During 1921 and 1922, he was assistant chief, G-1 (personnel). From 1922 to 1924, he commanded the 5th Corps Area and, in 1924, he briefly commanded the Philippine Division, and from 1924 to 1926 he served in the Philippine Department. He commanded the 9th Corps Area from May 1926 to January 1927 before commanding the 2nd Corps Area from January to December 1927. He retired on December 24, 1927, having reached the mandatory retirement age of 64.

Personal life
On December 14, 1887, McRae married Florence Stouch, daughter of Lt. Col. R. H. Stouch, a Civil War veteran. Together they had three children: Donald M. McRae, Dorothy McRae, and Mildred McRae. He remarried to Helen "Nellie" Burgar Stouch, a former sister-in-law, on February 24, 1926.

After his retirement, he made his home in Berkeley, California. He died on May 1, 1940. McRae is buried in Arlington National Cemetery.

References

External links

Arlington National Cemetery

|-

1863 births
1940 deaths
United States Army Infantry Branch personnel
People from Telfair County, Georgia
American military personnel of the Spanish–American War
American military personnel of the Philippine–American War
United States Army generals of World War I
Burials at Arlington National Cemetery
United States Army generals
United States Military Academy alumni
United States Army War College alumni
Recipients of the Distinguished Service Medal (US Army)
Recipients of the Silver Star
Recipients of the Croix de Guerre (France)
Commandeurs of the Légion d'honneur
Companions of the Order of the Bath
Military personnel from Georgia (U.S. state)